Cham Choqa (also Romanized as Cham Choqā; also known as Cham Choghā-ye Rīkā) is a village in Kuhdasht-e Jonubi Rural District, in the Central District of Kuhdasht County, Lorestan Province, Iran. At the 2006 census, its population was 76, in 18 families.

References 

Towns and villages in Kuhdasht County